The Baltic Medal was a campaign medal approved on 6 June 1856, for issue to officers and men of the Royal Navy, Royal Marines, and Royal Sappers and Miners who served between March 1854 and August 1855 in the Baltic Sea operations against Russia in the Baltic theatre of the Crimean War, or Åland War.  The medal primarily covered naval actions but was also awarded to 106 men of the Royal Sappers and Miners who were landed to place demolition charges against Russian fortifications at Bomarsund and Sveaborg.

Description  
 A circular silver medal,  in diameter. 
 Obverse: The diademed head of Queen Victoria with the legend VICTORIA REGINA, designed by William Wyon.
 Reverse: A seated figure of Britannia holding a trident with the fortresses at Bomarsund and Sveaborg behind. Above is the word BALTIC and below the dates 1854-1855. Designed by Leonard Charles Wyon.
 Clasps: None were authorised.
 Naming: Issued unnamed, except for the 106 medals awarded to Royal Sappers and Miners, which had the recipient's name and unit impressed on the rim of the medal in block Roman capitals. Some naval recipients had their medals privately engraved.

References

Bibliography
 
 Mussel, J (ed) - Medal Yearbook - 2015, (2014), Token Publishing.
 Joslin, Litherland, and Simpkin (eds), British Battles and Medals, (1988), Spink
 

British campaign medals
Crimean War